Mind:state is an electronic music one man act from Sweden that popped up in the late 1990s. Influenced by electronic bands like Front 242, Assemblage 23, KMFDM and also a wide range of metal bands such as Tiamat and Darkseed, Per Holmström creates electronic music that crosses between the lines of futurepop and darker industrial.

Biography 

Founded in 1999, Per Holmström started working on his first demo entitled Forward. It was not until eight years later, when his first studio album DECAYED, REBUILT was released on Alfa Matrix, that the true voice of Per's work was heard. The album got both good and bad critique but became a big success in Germany and was featured on the DAC for a total of six weeks, peaking on position No. 4.

Live line up

Current line up 
With an ever changing line up for live play, the current line up consists of:
 Per Holmström - vocals
 Marcus Liverholm - keys
 Mathias Fogelström - drums

Previous live members 
 Jonas Klåvus - keys (2004)
 Eric Klinga - keys (2004–2005)

Discography

Albums
 Decayed, rebuilt (Alfa Matrix, 2007)

EPs
 BBBC2x (Alfa Matrix, 2006)

Compilation albums
 Cyberl@b 5.0 (Alfa Matrix, 2005)
 Cryonica Tanz 4.0 (Cryonica Music, 2005)
 Re:connected [2.0] (Alfa Matrix, 2006)
 Fxxk The Mainstream vol. 1 (Alfa Matrix, 2007)

External links 
 
MIND:STATE official SoundCloud
MIND:STATE on Vampirefreaks
MIND:STATE's official label Alfa Matrix 

Electro-industrial music groups
Electronic body music groups
Musical groups established in 1999
Swedish electronic music groups
Swedish alternative rock groups
Swedish industrial music groups
1999 establishments in Sweden